These hits topped the Dutch Top 40 in 1990.

See also
1990 in music

References

1990 in the Netherlands
1990 record charts
1990